Dennis Olsen is the name of:

Dennis Olsen (actor) (born 1938), Australian actor and singer
Dennis Olsen (racing driver) (born 1996), Norwegian racing driver
Dennis Olsen (soccer player) (born 1997), Danish-Canadian soccer player

See also
 Dennis Olson (disambiguation)